The National Census of 1960 was the 5th comprehensive national census of the Republic of South Africa. It undertook to enumerate every person present in South Africa on the census night of 6 September 1960.

Pre-enumeration

Enumeration

Post-enumeration Survey

Results

Demographics

City rankings 
Statistics collected during the Apartheid era are regarded as unreliable with regard to measuring African populations. This is because the Native Areas Amendment Bill and the Group Areas Act tended to skew official statistics and underestimate the number of people living in urban areas.

See also 

 Census in South Africa
 South African National Census of 2001
 Demographics of South Africa

References 

Censuses in South Africa
1960 in South Africa
1960 censuses